Ladybellegate House, 20 Longsmith Street, Gloucester GL1 2HT, (National Grid Reference: SO 83003 18556) is a Grade I listed building with English Heritage, reference number 1245726.

History
The building is a town house built around 1704 for Edward Wagstaffe. The house is notable for its fine Rococo plasterwork and carved oak staircase.

Robert Raikes junior, founder of Sunday Schools, was born at Ladybellegate House in 1736. He also lived there from 1757 to 1772.

From 1740 to 1743, the house was let to Henry Guise of Elmore during which time it was remodelled to include fine moulded panels incorporating the swan crest of the Guise family.

Restoration
The building was acquired from the Post Office by the Gloucester Civic Trust in 1978. A loan from the Architectural Heritage Fund was combined with a successful fund raising to enable the building to be restored and the house was reopened by HRH Princess Anne in 1979. It was the trust's first major restoration. The building was subsequently sold and the proceeds placed in the Gloucester Historic Buildings Fund, which is run jointly by Gloucester Historic Buildings Ltd and Gloucester City Council.

Today the building is used as offices.

References

Further reading
Rogers, M. Ladybellegate House, Gloucester and Robert Raikes. Gloucester: Gloucestershire Record Office, 1975.

Grade I listed houses in Gloucestershire
Houses completed in 1704
Buildings and structures in Gloucester
History of Gloucester
1704 establishments in England